The Cooperative University of Colombia is a private institution of higher education founded in 1983, as a successor of the Instituto de Economía Social y Cooperativismo (Indesco).

Locations
The Cooperative University is characterized by its wide distribution nationally, with 18 campuses around the country en Apartadó, Arauca, Barrancabermeja, Bogotá, Bucaramanga, Cali, Cartago, Espinal, Ibagué, Medellín, Montería, Neiva, Pasto, Pereira, Popayán, Quibdó, Santa Marta y Villavicencio.

References

 

Universities and colleges in Colombia